Islam Khan (born 26 November 1953) is a former Pakistani cricket umpire. He stood in two ODI games between 1994 and 1995.

See also
 List of One Day International cricket umpires

References

1953 births
Living people
Pakistani One Day International cricket umpires
People from Karachi